Flamin' Hot is a 2023 American biographical drama film directed by Eva Longoria, and written by Lewis Colick and Linda Yvette. It stars Jesse Garcia, Annie Gonzalez, Emilio Rivera, Dennis Haysbert, Matt Walsh, and Tony Shalhoub. It is based on the memoir A Boy, A Burrito and A Cookie: from Janitor to Executive by Richard Montañez and the life stories of Montañez and Judy Montañez.

The film had its world premiere at South by Southwest (SXSW) on March 11, 2023, and is scheduled to be released on Hulu and Disney+ on June 9, 2023.

Premise
Flamin' Hot is the story of Richard Montañez, the Frito-Lay janitor who claimed to have invented Flamin' Hot Cheetos.

Cast
 Jesse Garcia as Richard Montañez
 Annie Gonzalez as Judy Montañez, Richard's wife
 Emilio Rivera as Vacho Montañez
 Dennis Haysbert as Clarence C. Baker
 Tony Shalhoub as Roger Enrico
 Matt Walsh
 Pepe Serna
 Bobby Soto
 Jimmy Gonzales
 Brice Gonzalez

Production
In August 2019, it was reported Eva Longoria would direct the film, with DeVon Franklin producing under his Franklin Entertainment banner and Searchlight Pictures also producing. In May 2021, Jesse Garcia and Annie Gonzalez joined the cast of the film. The film completed production in August 2021, where the cast was announced.

Release 
Flamin' Hot had its world premiere at South by Southwest (SXSW) on March 11, 2023, before its streaming release on Hulu and Disney+ on June 9, 2023.

Reception

References

External links
 

2020s American films
2020s biographical drama films
2020s English-language films
2023 films
2023 directorial debut films
Hispanic and Latino American drama films
Hulu original films
Searchlight Pictures films
American biographical drama films
Films about food and drink
Films scored by Marcelo Zarvos
Films based on memoirs